"Back on the Wall" is a song by American singer-songwriter and pianist Greyson Chance and is the second song from his second extended play Somewhere Over My Head. .

Track listing

Music video
The music video was directed by Rage. It was uploaded on YouTube on April 28, 2016.

References

2016 songs
2016 singles
Greyson Chance songs
Songs written by Greyson Chance